Kelly Massey (born 11 January 1985) is a British track and field athlete who specialises in the 400 metres. She competed for England in the women's 4 × 400 metres relay at the 2014 Commonwealth Games where she won a bronze medal, and for Great Britain in the women's 4 × 400 metres relay at the 2016 Summer Olympics where she again won a bronze medal.

Competition record

References 

1985 births
Living people
Sportspeople from Coventry
English female sprinters
British female sprinters
Olympic female sprinters
Olympic athletes of Great Britain
Olympic bronze medallists for Great Britain
Olympic bronze medalists in athletics (track and field)
Athletes (track and field) at the 2016 Summer Olympics
Medalists at the 2016 Summer Olympics
Commonwealth Games silver medallists for England
Commonwealth Games bronze medallists for England
Commonwealth Games medallists in athletics
Athletes (track and field) at the 2010 Commonwealth Games
Athletes (track and field) at the 2014 Commonwealth Games
Universiade medalists in athletics (track and field)
Universiade bronze medalists for Great Britain
Medalists at the 2011 Summer Universiade
Medalists at the 2007 Summer Universiade
British Athletics Championships winners
European Athletics Championships winners
Medallists at the 2010 Commonwealth Games
Medallists at the 2014 Commonwealth Games